Leo T. Foley (October 25, 1928 – February 5, 2016) was an American politician who was a member of the Minnesota Senate representing District 49 from 1997 to 2003, and District 47 from 2003 to 2011, which includes portions of Anoka and Hennepin counties in the northern Twin Cities metropolitan area. A Democrat, he was first elected to the Senate in 1996, and was re-elected in 2000, 2002 and 2006. Prior to the 2002 legislative redistricting, the area was known as District 49. He was unseated by Republican Benjamin Kruse in the 2010 general election.

Senate leadership
Foley was a member of the Senate's Capital Investment Committee, the Finance Committee, and the Judiciary Committee. He also served on the Finance subcommittees for the Judiciary Budget Division (which he chaired), and for the Public Safety Budget Division. His special legislative concerns included education, health care, crime prevention, the environment, transportation, and social services.

Professional career and education
Foley worked as a laborer for the Great Northern Railway from 1946 to 1947, then joined the United States Navy from 1947 to 1952, serving in the Korean War. He was a security officer at the Twin City Arsenal from 1952 to 1954, then became a member of the Minnesota State Patrol from 1954 to 1987. He attended the University of Minnesota and Metropolitan State University, earning his B.A. in public administration in 1974. He later attended Northwestern University and Minnesota State University, Mankato, earning a M.A. in public administration in 1979.

After retiring from the Minnesota State Patrol as a major in 1987, Foley worked as security manager for Unisys Corporation from 1987 to 1990. He was a deputy sheriff with the Anoka County Sheriff's Department from 1990 to 1992, then worked as a law clerk with the Anoka County Attorney's Office while earning his J.D. degree from William Mitchell College of Law in Saint Paul, which he received in 1994. From 1994 onwards he was an assistant county attorney for Anoka County.

Community service
Foley was active on government and community-based boards through the years. He chaired and was a member of the City of Anoka's Planning Commission from 1977 to 1997. He chaired and was a member of the Anoka Human Rights Commission from 1970 to 1996. He served as president of the Ramsey County Chiefs of Police organization, and was a member of the Minnesota State Advisory Council on Mental Health. He was a member of the American Bar Association and the Minnesota State Bar Association.

Death
Foley died on February 5, 2016, in Coon Rapids, Minnesota.

References

External links

Senator Foley Web Page
Minnesota Public Radio Votetracker: Senator Leo Foley
Project Vote Smart - Senator Leo Foley Profile

1928 births
2016 deaths
Democratic Party Minnesota state senators
People from Coon Rapids, Minnesota
University of Minnesota alumni
Metropolitan State University alumni
Northwestern University alumni
Minnesota State University, Mankato alumni
William Mitchell College of Law alumni
Minnesota lawyers
21st-century American politicians
20th-century American lawyers